Namibicola karios is a species of snout moth in the genus Namibicola. It was described by Wolfram Mey in 2011 and is known from Namibia (including Karas, the type location).

References

Moths described in 2011
Phycitinae